The Tanzer 22 is a Canadian trailerable sailboat, that was designed by Johann Tanzer and first built in 1970. The design went out of production in 1986.

Production
The boat was built by Tanzer Industries Limited in Dorion, Quebec. 270 Tanzer 22s were also built in Edenton, North Carolina and 167 were built in Arlington, Washington. Tanzer Industries went out of business in 1986 and the molds and tooling were sold to Kisber & Company, which built the boat for approximately one year.  Kisber sold the design to Canadian Yacht Builders, but that company did not put the boat back into production. Later the Tanzer 22 class association acquired the sailboat design, tooling and the rights to the name, through a share-sale to its members. It is not known if they have constructed any boats.

A total of 2271 Tanzer 22s were constructed.

Design
The Tanzer 22 is a small recreational keelboat, built predominantly of fibreglass, with wood trim. It has a masthead sloop rig and a transom-hung rudder. It displaces  and carries  of ballast.

The boat is normally fitted with a small  outboard motor for docking and maneuvering.

The design has sleeping accommodation for four people, with a double "V"-berth in the bow cabin, a straight quarter berth to starboard in the main cabin and a drop-down dinette table berth on the port side. The galley is located on the starboard side just aft of the bow cabin. The galley is equipped with a two-burner stove, an ice box and a sink. The optional head is located in the bow cabin under the "V"-berth.

The boat has a PHRF racing average handicap of 237 with a high of 243 and low of 222.

Variants

Tanzer 22
Tanzer 22 CB
Tanzer 22 T/4
The T/4 was designed for the International Offshore Rule Mk. III, Quarter Ton class and has a slightly modified rudder and sailplan. The rules were changed just after its introduction, resulting in a short production run.

Operational history
In a review Michael McGoldrick wrote, "this boat is supported by a very active class association. In fact, anyone buying a Tanzer 22 will quickly discover that they are part of a network of owners who take a great deal of pride in their boats...All this means that many Tanzer 22s are being actively raced as a one-design or under PHRF. But this is also a boat that can take a small family out for a short cruise. It has a big cockpit and a flush deck which provides for lots of sunbathing space. Below there is more room than first meets the eye, despite the fact that the bulkhead which divides the v-berth from the main cabin gives the appearance of cramped quarters. On top of all this, the Tanzer 22 has gained a considerable reputation for seagoing capabilities."

In a 2010 review Steve Henkel wrote, "the boat is relatively fast, as indicated by her PHRF rating compared to her comp[etitor]s. Worst features: The mainsheet is fixed to the cockpit sole just ahead of the tiller,
which reduces the spaciousness of the otherwise big, wide cockpit. The side-opening icebox loses some ofits cool every time the door is opened, and users risk being showered with food if the door is opened on starboard tack. Despite her beam near the top of her comp[etitor] range, she registers the lowest Space Index as a result of her low headroom, The forward end of her V-berth is too narrow for two adults."

See also
List of sailing boat types

Related development
Tanzer 7.5

Similar sailboats
Alberg 22
Buccaneer 220
Cape Dory 22
CS 22
DS-22
Edel 665
Falmouth Cutter 22
Hunter 22
J/22
Marlow-Hunter 22
Marshall 22
Nonsuch 22
Pearson Electra
Pearson Ensign
Ranger 22
Santana 22
Seaward 22
Spindrift 22
Starwind 223
Triton 22
US Yachts US 22

References

External links

Keelboats
1970s sailboat type designs
Sailing yachts
Trailer sailers
Sailboat type designs by Johann Tanzer
Sailboat types built by Tanzer Industries